Thérèse Daviau, also known as Thérèse Daviau-Bergeron (1946–2002), was a Canadian politician, an attorney and a City Councillor in Montreal, Quebec.

Career

Daviau was born in 1946 and received a law degree from Université de Montréal.  In the early seventies she became a founding member of the progressive Montreal Citizens' Movement, also known as Rassemblement des citoyens et citoyennes de Montréal (RCM) in French.

City councillor

Daviau was elected to Montreal's City Council in 1974 over opponents Civic Party incumbent Aime Sauve with 17 other MCM candidates, and represented the district of Saint-Michel, but was defeated in 1978 when Mayor Jean Drapeau's Civic Party of Montreal took nearly all the seats at City Hall.

Daviau ran again in 1986 in the district of Saint-Jean-Baptiste and won.  She was re-elected in 1990 and in 1994, representing the district of Plateau-Mont-Royal.

Party leader

In 1998 Daviau became the RCM nominee for the mayoral election and Leader of the Opposition.  Not long after though, she left the party and announced that she would support Jacques Duchesneau for mayor.  She sat as an Independent and did not run for re-election in 1998.

Retirement

Daviau became the vice-president of a public relations firm and died on February 1, 2002.

Personal life

Daviau is the mother of Geneviève Bergeron, one of the 14 victims of the École Polytechnique massacre of December 6, 1989.

Honors
Biennally, since 2004, the City of Montreal recognizes a person's remarkable commitment and outstanding contribution to the community by awarding the Thérèse-Daviau Award.

The citizen of the year award recognizes an individual who has distinguished themselves through their work in social development, sports and leisure, or culture, creating a significant contribution to improving the quality of life of Montrealers, or to advancing municipal democracy. Daviau was noted for these qualities over more than a quarter century, by defending the interests of Montrealers in municipal politics.

References

1946 births
2002 deaths
Montreal city councillors
Lawyers in Quebec
Université de Montréal alumni
Women municipal councillors in Canada
Women in Quebec politics
Canadian women lawyers
20th-century Canadian women politicians
20th-century women lawyers